PS-69 Tando Muhammad Khan-II is a constituency of the Provincial Assembly of Sindh.

General elections 2013

General elections 2008

See also
 PS-68 Tando Muhammad Khan-I
 PS-70 Badin-I

References

External links
 Election commission Pakistan's official website
 Awazoday.com check result
 Official Website of Government of Sindh

Constituencies of Sindh